The following were mayors of Rye, East Sussex, England:

Aug. 1390–1, 1393–4, 1395-7: John Baddyng
Aug. 1405-6, 1407–10; jurat 1413-14: William Long
August 1411–12 and approximately 1418–21: John Shelley
1509–11, 1516–17, 1519–20, July–August 1529 and 1531–2: Nicholas Sutton

References

Rye